Mola can refer to:

Places
 La Mola, Formentera, Balearic Islands, Spain
 Lake Mola, a lake near Ilirska Bistrica, Inner Carniola region, Slovenia
 Mola di Bari, or simply Mola, a city in Apulia, Southern Italy

Mountains
Mola de Colldejou, a mountain chain in Catalonia, Spain
Mola dels Quatre Termes, a mountain in Catalonia, Spain
Mola del Guerxet, a mountain in Catalonia, Spain
Mola Gran, a mountain in the Valencian Community, Spain
Mola de Llaberia, a mountain in Catalonia, Spain

Museums
 Museum of the Living Artist (MoLA), a new exhibition of works by San Diego artists
 Museum of London Archaeology (MOLA), an archaeological organisation and charity (formerly part of the Museum of London)
 Museum of Living Art (MOLA), an exhibition at Fort Worth Zoo, USA

People
 Mola Ram (1743–1833), Indian painter
 Mola Sylla (born 1956), Senegalese musician
 Carlos Loret de Mola (born 1976), Mexican journalist
 Carlos Loret de Mola Mediz (1921–1986), Mexican politician and journalist
 Carmen Mola, 2020s pseudonymous Spanish novelist
 Emilio Mola (1887–1937), Spanish army officer of the Spanish Civil War
 Pasquale Mola (fl. 1908), Italian biologist who proposed the Sardinian lynx
 Pier Francesco Mola (1612–1666), Italian painter

Other
 Mola (art form),  the textile art form of the Kuna people of Panama and Colombia
 Mola (fish), a genus of fish in the family Molidae
Ocean sunfish, Mola mola or common mola
 Mola (streaming service), a streaming service based in Indonesia
 Mola Ram (Indiana Jones character), the main antagonist in Indiana Jones and the Temple of Doom
 Mars Orbiter Laser Altimeter, an instrument on the Mars Global Surveyor orbiter
 Ministry of Legal Affairs, the Ministry of Legal Affairs in the Sultanate of Oman
 a Latin word which is the origin of the word molar

See also
 
 MOLAA, the Museum of Latin American Art, Long Beach, California
 Molas (disambiguation)
 Moles (disambiguation)